La Jarosa reservoir (also known as the Jarosa swamp) is located in the Jarosa valley and it belongs to the municipality of Guadarrama, Madrid, Spain. It is the smallest reservoir of the Sierra de Guadarrama mountain range. Its total capacity reaches 7’2 cubic hectometres and its total surface area is 55 hectares.
La Jarosa, does not only include the main swamp but also the meadows surrounding the body of water, several recreational zones and vast pine forest areas. The Nuestra Señora de la Jarosa hermitage and the Altar Mayor hermitage are also found in this vast terrain. 
La Jarosa would be included in the proposed Guadarrama National Park project, once it is finally realized. The lower zone, which contains the marsh, would belong to the "pre-park" area for consideration for the Regional Park but the highest part of La Jarosa, adjacent to the Puerto de Guadarrama, would be included in the National Park itself.

History
La Jarosa reservoir was built in 1968 as a part of General Franco's economic policies on water reservoirs. It was decided that its location would be the Herrería Village, deserted two centuries earlier. Even today the remains of the tower of the St. Macarius chapel are still visible, lodged in the meadows around the swamp. When the water level permits, it is possible to wander among the remains of the old houses of the village which remain flooded beneath the swamp waters.

Description of the environment

Geology
In the areas surrounding the marsh, the most abundant rocks are granite, gneiss and quartz, but biotite, muscovite, mica and plagioclase can also be found. There is sedimentary material on the river beds, as a result of erosion by the water flow.

Flora and fauna
La Jarosa is home to many wildlife species. Many butterflies, lizards, owls, storks, squirrels, foxes, wild boars, and dormice, among others, live in its forests. It is easy to find trout, rainbow trout, pikes, black bass, frogs and toads in the waters of the reservoir.
On the other hand, the famous La Jarosa pine wood houses three different types of pines: maritime pine, european black pine and stone pine. Tree scrubs such as gum rocks, rosemary and thyme can also be found. In the upper areas of La Jarosa, herbaceous vegetation forms the main vegetation.

Hydrology
La Jarosa reservoir is the most important to the Guadarrama municipality. It is the only source of drinking water supply for the Guadarrama municipality as well as for Alpedrete, El Escorial and San Lorenzo de El Escorial. It has a capacity of 7.2 hm³, however most of the times it does not reach its full capacity. Incoming water to the swamp comes out of the Guatel stream, the La Jarosa stream and the Las Cerradillas stream. Two dams had to be built to contain these waters. One dam is to cut the flow of the La Jarosa stream and the other serves to prevent overflow into the head of the Fuente Cornejo stream.

Recreation
La Jarosa has become a tourist site and is very popular among the citizens of the Community of Madrid as an area for relaxing and experiencing the natural countryside. The most popular activities in this environment are hiking and fishing. Swimming is forbidden in the reservoir, as it is a drinking water source.

See also

References

Reservoirs in the Community of Madrid